Brekken Idrettslag is a Norwegian multi-sports club from Brekkebygd, Sør-Trøndelag. It has sections for football, handball, Nordic skiing, gymnastics and motor sports.

The club was founded in 1933. The men's football team currently plays in the 5. Divisjon, the sixth tier of Norwegian football. It had a single-season stint in the 3. divisjon in 2000, and before that also a stint from 1994 to 1997.

References

Official site 

Football clubs in Norway
Association football clubs established in 1933
Sport in Trøndelag
Røros
1933 establishments in Norway